Deep Space Climate Observatory (DSCOVR; formerly known as Triana, unofficially known as GoreSat) is a National Oceanic and Atmospheric Administration (NOAA) space weather, space climate, and Earth observation satellite. It was launched by SpaceX on a Falcon 9 v1.1 launch vehicle on 11 February 2015, from Cape Canaveral. This is NOAA's first operational deep space satellite and became its primary system of warning Earth in the event of solar magnetic storms.

DSCOVR was originally proposed as an Earth observation spacecraft positioned at the Sun-Earth  Lagrange point, providing live video of the sunlit side of the planet through the Internet as well as scientific instruments to study climate change. Political changes in the United States resulted in the mission's cancellation, and in 2001 the spacecraft was placed into storage.

Proponents of the mission continued to push for its reinstatement, and a change in presidential administration in 2009 resulted in DSCOVR being taken out of storage and refurbished, and its mission was refocused to solar observation and early warning of coronal mass ejections while still providing Earth observation and climate monitoring. It launched aboard a SpaceX Falcon 9 launch vehicle on 11 February 2015, and reached  on 8 June 2015.

NOAA operates DSCOVR from its Satellite and Product Operations Facility in Suitland, Maryland. The acquired space data that allows for accurate weather forecasts are carried out in the Space Weather Prediction Center in Boulder, Colorado. Archival records are held by the National Centers for Environmental Information, and processing of Earth sensor data is carried out by NASA.

History 

DSCOVR began as a proposal in 1998 by then-Vice President Al Gore for the purpose of whole-Earth observation at the Sun-Earth  Lagrange point,  from Earth. Originally known as Triana, named after Rodrigo de Triana, the first of Columbus's crew to sight land in the Americas, the spacecraft's original purpose was to provide a near-continuous view of the entire Earth and make that live image available via the Internet. Gore hoped not only to advance science with these images, but also to raise awareness of the Earth itself, updating the influential Blue Marble photograph that was taken by Apollo 17. In addition to an imaging camera, a radiometer would take the first direct measurements of how much sunlight is reflected and emitted from the whole Earth (albedo). This data could constitute a barometer for the process of global warming. The scientific goals expanded to measure the amount of solar energy reaching Earth, cloud patterns, weather systems, monitor the health of Earth's vegetation, and track the amount of UV light reaching the surface through the ozone layer.

In 1999, NASA's Inspector General reported that "the basic concept of the Triana mission was not peer reviewed", and "Triana's added science may not represent the best expenditure of NASA's limited science funding". Members of the U.S. Congress asked the National Academy of Sciences whether the project was worthwhile. The resulting report, released March 2000, stated that the mission was "strong and scientifically vital".

The Bush administration put the project on hold shortly after George W. Bush's inauguration in January 2001. Triana was removed from its original launch opportunity on STS-107 (the ill-fated Columbia mission in 2003). The US$150 million  spacecraft was placed into nitrogen blanketed storage at Goddard Space Flight Center in November 2001 and remained there for the duration of the Bush administration. NASA renamed the spacecraft Deep Space Climate Observatory (DSCOVR) in 2003 in an attempt to regain support for the project, but the mission was formally terminated by NASA in 2005.

In November 2008, funded by National Oceanic and Atmospheric Administration (NOAA) and the U.S. Air Force, the spacecraft was removed from storage and underwent testing to determine its viability for launch. After the Obama administration took presidency in 2009, that year's budget included US$9 million marked for refurbishment and readiness of the spacecraft, resulting in NASA refurbishing the EPIC instrument and recalibrating the NISTAR instrument. Al Gore used part of his book Our Choice (2009) as an attempt to revive debate on the DSCOVR payload. The book mentions legislative efforts by senators Barbara Mikulski and Bill Nelson to get the spacecraft launched. In February 2011, the Obama administration attempted to secure funding to re-purpose the DSCOVR spacecraft as a solar observatory to replace the aging Advanced Composition Explorer (ACE) spacecraft, and requested US$47.3 million in the 2012 fiscal budget toward this purpose. Part of this funding was to allow the Naval Research Laboratory (NRL) to construct a coronal mass ejection imager for the spacecraft, but the time required would have delayed DSCOVR's launch and it was ultimately not included. NOAA allocated US$2 million in its 2011 budget to initiate the refurbishment effort, and increased funding to US$29.8 million in 2012.

In 2012, the Air Force allocated US$134.5 million to procure a launch vehicle and fund launch operations, both of which were awarded to SpaceX for their Falcon 9 rocket. In September 2013, NASA cleared DSCOVR to proceed to the implementation phase targeting an early 2015 launch, which ultimately took place on 11 February 2015. NASA's Goddard Space Flight Center is providing management and systems engineering to the mission.

In the 2017 documentary, An Inconvenient Sequel: Truth to Power, Al Gore speaks of the history of the DSCOVR spacecraft and its relation to climate change.

Spacecraft 

The main science instrument sets are the Sun-observing Plasma Magnetometer (PlasMag) and the Earth-observing NIST Advanced Radiometer (NISTAR) and Earth Polychromatic Imaging Camera (EPIC). DSCOVR has two deployable solar arrays, a propulsion module, boom, and antenna.

From its vantage point, DSCOVR monitors variable solar wind conditions, provides early warning of approaching coronal mass ejections and observes phenomena on Earth, including changes in ozone, aerosols, dust and volcanic ash, cloud height, vegetation cover and climate. At its Sun-Earth  location it has a continuous view of the Sun and of the sunlit side of the Earth. After the spacecraft arrived on-site and entered its operational phase, NASA began releasing near-real-time images of Earth through the EPIC instrument's website. DSCOVR takes full-Earth pictures about every two hours and is able to process them faster than other Earth observation satellites.

The spacecraft is in a looping halo orbit around the Sun-Earth Lagrange point L1 in a six-month period, with a spacecraft–Earth–Sun angle varying from 4° to 15°.

Instruments

PlasMag 
The Plasma-Magnetometer (PlasMag) measures solar wind for space weather predictions. It can provide early warning detection of solar activity that could cause damage to existing satellite systems and ground infrastructure. Because solar particles reach  about an hour before Earth, PlasMag can provide a warning of 15 to 60 minutes before a coronal mass ejection (CME) arrives. It does this by measuring "the magnetic field and the velocity distribution functions of the electron, proton and alpha particles (helium nuclei) of solar wind". It has three instruments:
 Magnetometer measures magnetic field
 Faraday cup measures positively charged particles
 Electrostatic analyzer measures electrons

EPIC 

The Earth Polychromatic Imaging Camera (EPIC) takes images of the sunlit side of Earth for various Earth science monitoring purposes in ten different channels from ultraviolet to near-infrared. Ozone and aerosol levels are monitored along with cloud dynamics, properties of the land, and vegetation.

Earth's apparent diameter varies from 0.45° to 0.53° full width. Exposure time for each of the 10 narrowband channels (317, 325, 340, 388, 443, 552, 680, 688, 764, and 779 nm) is about 40 ms. The camera produces 2048 × 2048 pixel images, but to increase the number of downloadable images to ten per hour the resolution is averaged to 1024 × 1024 on board.

NISTAR 
The National Institute of Standards and Technology Advanced Radiometer (NISTAR) was designed and built between 1999 and 2001 by NIST in Gaithersburg, MD and  Ball Aerospace & Technologies in Boulder, Colorado. NISTAR measures irradiance of the sunlit face of the Earth. This means that NISTAR measures if the atmosphere of Earth is taking in more or less solar energy than it is radiating back towards space. This data is to be used to study changes in Earth's radiation budget caused by natural and human activities.

Using NISTAR data, scientists can help determine the impact that humanity is having on the atmosphere of Earth and make the necessary changes to help balance the radiation budget. The radiometer measures in four channels:
 For total radiation in ultraviolet, visible and infrared in the range 0.2–100 µm
 For reflected solar radiation in the ultraviolet, visible and near-infrared in the range 0.2–4 µm
 For reflected solar radiation in infrared in the range 0.7–4 µm
 For calibration purposes in the range 0.3–1 µm

Launch 
The DSCOVR launch was conducted by launch provider SpaceX using their Falcon 9 v1.1 rocket. The launch of DSCOVR took place on 11 February 2015, following two scrubbed launches.

Launch attempt history

Post-launch flight test 

SpaceX planned to conduct a test flight where they would attempt to bring the first stage back through the atmosphere and land the expended first stage on a  floating landing platform.

Relative to earlier tests, the first-stage return on DSCOVR was much more challenging, especially in atmospheric reentry due to the deep-space nature of the Earth–Sun L1 launch trajectory for DSCOVR. This would only be the second time that SpaceX ever tried to recover the first stage of the Falcon 9 launch vehicle. SpaceX expected deceleration-force loads to be twice as high and rocket heating to quadruple over the reentry conditions on Falcon 9 Flight 14. Before the launch, the drone ship was in ocean surface conditions that made the barge landing infeasible. Therefore, the landing platform attempt was called off, and the first stage made an over-water soft landing instead. This continued the collection of returnable first-stage test data on all the earlier phases of the flight test and added data on stage survival following a high-speed, high-load atmospheric entry.

2nd stage disposal 

The second stage of the Falcon 9 launch vehicle, after releasing DSCOVR and supposedly surpassing L1, has probably been perturbed into a heliocentric orbit over time. In 2022 it was originally misidentified as a different piece of space debris and thought to have been on a collision course with the moon, but there's now evidence that the impacting object might actually be part of the Chang'e 5-T1 mission. Independent spectral analysis from the University of Arizona supports the Chinese origin of the object.

Operation 

EPIC provides a daily series of Earth images, enabling the first-time study of daily variations over the entire globe. The images, available 12 to 36 hours after they are made, have been posted to a dedicated web page since September 2015.

DSCOVR was placed in operation at the L1 Lagrange point to monitor the Sun, because the constant stream of particles from the Sun (the solar wind) reaches L1 about 60 minutes before reaching Earth. DSCOVR will usually be able to provide a 15 to 60 minutes warning before a surge of particles and magnetic field from a coronal mass ejection (CME) reaches Earth and creates a geomagnetic storm. DSCOVR data will also be used to improve predictions of the impact locations of a geomagnetic storm to be able to take preventative action. Electronic technologies such as satellites in geosynchronous orbit are at risk of unplanned disruptions without warnings from DSCOVR and other monitoring satellites at L1.

On 16–17 July 2015, DSCOVR took a series of images showing the Moon during a transit of Earth. The images were taken between 19:50 and 00:45 UTC. The animation was composed of monochrome images taken in different color filters at 30-second intervals for each frame, resulting in a slight color fringing for the Moon in each finished frame. Due to its position at Sun–Earth L1, DSCOVR will always see the Moon illuminated and will always see its far side when it passes in front of Earth.

On 19 October 2015, NASA opened a new website to host near-live "Blue Marble" images taken by EPIC of Earth. Twelve images are released each day, every two hours, showcasing Earth as it rotates on its axis.

On 27 June 2019, DSCOVR was put into safe mode due to an anomaly with the laser gyroscope of the Miniature Inertial Measurement Unit (MIMU), part of the spacecraft's attitude control system. Operators programmed a software patch that allows DSCOVR to operate without a laser gyroscope, using only the star tracker for angular rate information. DSCOVR came out of the safe hold on 2 March 2020, and resumed normal operations.

Animations

See also 
 Clouds and the Earth's Radiant Energy System
 STEREO
 Visual Monitoring Camera
 List of Falcon 9 and Falcon Heavy launches

References

External links 

 DSCOVR website at NOAA.gov
 DSCOVR at eoPortal.org
 EPIC global images at NASA.gov

Further reading 
 
 
 
 Rebuttal: 
 
 

National Oceanic and Atmospheric Administration
Earth observation satellites of the United States
SpaceX payloads contracted by NASA
Space probes launched in 2015
Spacecraft using halo orbits
Spacecraft using Lissajous orbits
Earth imaging satellites
Geospace monitoring satellites
Artificial satellites at Earth-Sun Lagrange points